Spectrum is an album by pianist Cedar Walton, recorded in 1968 and released on the Prestige label.

Reception

The AllMusic review by Scott Yanow stated: "The music, essentially advanced hard bop with a few odd twists, is well-played if not essential."

Track listing 
All compositions by Cedar Walton, except as indicated
 "Higgins Holler" – 10:20   
 "Days of Wine and Roses" (Henry Mancini, Johnny Mercer) – 8:56   
 "Jake's Milkshakes" – 3:55   
 "Spectrum" – 5:39   
 "Lady Charlotte" (Cal Massey) – 6:14

Personnel 
Cedar Walton – piano
Blue Mitchell – trumpet (tracks 1 & 3–5)
Clifford Jordan – tenor saxophone (tracks 1 & 3–5)
Richard Davis – bass
Jack DeJohnette – drums

Production
Don Schlitten – producer
Richard Alderson – engineer

References 

Cedar Walton albums
1968 albums
Prestige Records albums
Albums produced by Don Schlitten